Scrobipalpa nomias is a moth in the family Gelechiidae. It was described by Edward Meyrick in 1921. It is found in South Africa.

The forewings are fuscous suffusedly sprinkled with dark grey. The stigmata are blackish, the plical obliquely before the first discal. There is an obscure brownish line along the fold and a longitudinal streak of dark fuscous suffusion from beyond the second discal stigma to near the apex. The hindwings are rather bluish grey.

References

Endemic moths of South Africa
Scrobipalpa
Moths described in 1921